Wiesława Krystyna Nizioł (pronounced ) is a Polish mathematician, director of research at CNRS, based at Institut mathématique de Jussieu. Her research concerns arithmetic geometry, and in particular p-adic Hodge theory, Galois representations, and p-adic cohomology.

Education and career
Nizioł earned an M.S. in computer science from the University of Warsaw in 1984. She was employed as an assistant professor at the University of Warsaw from 1984 to 1988.

After beginning doctoral studies in computer science at Stanford University, she switched to mathematics, and received her Ph.D. in 1991 from Princeton University under the supervision of Gerd Faltings.

Thereafter she held temporary positions at Harvard University, the University of Chicago and University of Minnesota before joining the University of Utah in 1996. More recently, she has spent time at the Institute for Advanced Study in 2010 as a visitor and in 2017 as a member as well as at the Mathematical Sciences Research Institute in 2014 and 2018 as part of programs on perfectoid spaces and the homological conjectures, respectively.

She moved to France in 2012 as a directrice de recherches at CNRS, first in École normale supérieure de Lyon and, since 2020 at Institut mathématique de Jussieu in Paris.

Mathematical work
She studies the cohomology of -adic varieties. Her contributions include:
 A definition for -adic algebraic varieties, of a -adic analog (the syntomic cohomology) of the classical Deligne cohomology for algebraic varieties over the real numbers.
 A comparison theorem, via syntomic methods, for -adic analytic varieties, and the computation of the -adic étale cohomology of various -adic symmetric spaces with applications to the -adic local Langlands correspondence.

Recognition
She was an Invited Speaker at the 2006 International Congress of Mathematicians, with a talk entitled "p-adic motivic cohomology in arithmetic".
She is a member of Academia Europaea since 2021.

References

External links

Year of birth missing (living people)
Living people
Polish mathematicians
Polish women mathematicians
University of Warsaw alumni
Princeton University alumni
University of Utah faculty
Institute for Advanced Study visiting scholars
Arithmetic geometers
Research directors of the French National Centre for Scientific Research